George Arthur Lindbeck (March 10, 1923 – January 8, 2018) was an American Lutheran theologian. He was best known as an ecumenicist and as one of the fathers of postliberal theology.

Early life and education
Lindbeck was born on March 10, 1923, in Luoyang, China, the son of American Lutheran missionaries. Raised in that country and in Korea for the first seventeen years of his life, he was often sickly as a child and found himself often isolated from the world around himself.

He attended Gustavus Adolphus College, graduating with a Bachelor of Arts degree in 1943. He went on to do graduate work at Yale University, receiving his Bachelor of Divinity degree in 1946. He earned his Doctor of Philosophy degree from Yale in 1955 concentrating on medieval studies, delivering a dissertation on the Franciscan theologian Duns Scotus.

Career

Lindbeck first gained attention as a medievalist and as a participant in ecumenical discussions in academia and the church. He was a "delegate observer" to the Second Vatican Council. After that time, he made important contributions to ecumenical dialogue, especially between Lutherans and Roman Catholics. From 1968 to 1987 he was a member of the Joint Commission between the Vatican and Lutheran World Federation.  In 1994, Lindbeck spoke at length about his memories of Vatican II with George Weigel, and a transcript of his interview with Weigel was published in the December 1994 edition of First Things.

His best-known work is The Nature of Doctrine: Religion and Theology in a Postliberal Age, published in 1984. It was widely influential and is one of the key works in the formation and founding of postliberal theology.

He was appointed to the Yale Divinity School faculty in 1952 before his studies were finished, and remained there until his retirement in 1993. His book The Church in a Postliberal Age was published in 2002.

He was a fellow of the American Academy of Arts and Sciences, and a recipient of the Wilbur Cross Medal from the Yale Graduate School Alumni Association.

Lindbeck died on January 8, 2018.

Selected works 

 Lindbeck, George A. (1984). The Nature of Doctrine: Religion and Theology in a Postliberal Age. Louisville: Westminster John Knox Press. 
 Lindbeck, George A. (2003). The Church in a Postliberal Age. Grand Rapids, MI: William B. Eerdmans.

References

Further reading

 preface by Hazel Andrews

1923 births
2018 deaths
20th-century American theologians
20th-century Protestant theologians
American Lutheran theologians
Evangelical Lutheran Church in America Christians
Gustavus Adolphus College alumni
People in Christian ecumenism
Yale Divinity School alumni
Yale Divinity School faculty
American expatriates in China